Willem Peeters (born 20 May 1953) is a Belgian former professional racing cyclist. He won the Omloop Het Nieuwsblad in 1976.

References

External links
 
 

1953 births
Living people
Belgian male cyclists
Sportspeople from Leuven
Cyclists from Flemish Brabant